Joshua Lyons Gondelman (born January 15, 1985) is an American author, comedy writer, producer, and stand-up comedian. He is currently a supervising producer and writer for Desus & Mero on Showtime. He was previously a writer on Last Week Tonight with John Oliver. He is also known for co-creating the parody Twitter account @SeinfeldToday.

Early life and education
Gondelman grew up in Stoneham, Massachusetts, to parents Ellion Lyons and David Gondelman. He grew up in a Jewish family.

Gondelman graduated from Stoneham High School in 2003. He graduated from Brandeis University in 2007, where he double majored in creative writing and English, and minored in Spanish.

Career
When he was 19 years old, Gondelman began doing standup comedy in Boston. He did stand-up in Boston for seven years, and occasionally returns. After college, he worked as a pre-school teacher and taught elementary school Spanish. In 2011, Gondelman moved to New York City, where his then-girlfriend lived, to do more stand-up comedy.

During this time he also began doing freelance writing. He co-wrote his first major story, "Both Sides of a Break Up", with his recent ex-girlfriend; it was published in New York Magazine in 2012.  In 2013, he wrote a story for Esquire describing his experience running in a Tough Mudder race in which he was sponsored by Wheaties in exchange for monetary compensation from General Mills and Zeus Jones. He has also written for McSweeney's, The New Yorker, and The New York Times.

In October 2015, a book co-authored by Gondelman and Joe Berkowitz entitled You Blew It!: An Awkward Look at the Many Ways in Which You've Already Ruined Your Life, was published.

Stand-up 
As a stand-up comedian, he has opened for John Oliver, Jen Kirkman and Pete Holmes, and also performs regularly at New York City venues. Eve Peyser has said that during his stand-up, Gondelman "radiates humility and a relatable, everyday awkwardness alongside fierce confidence and wit."

Everything's The Best, his debut album, came out in 2011. His second album, Physical Whisper, was released on March 18, 2016.

In 2010, he won the Laughing Skull Comedy Festival in Atlanta, Georgia. In March 2016, he made his late-night television debut on Conan. He made his network television debut in January 2018 on Late Night with Seth Meyers.

SeinfeldToday
In December 2012, Gondelman created the Twitter account "SeinfeldToday", along with Jaclyn Moore, formerly of BuzzFeed. The account posted humorous tweets reimagining Seinfeld characters in modern-day situations. As of October 2015, the last time the account was active, it had more than 900,000 followers. At the 6th annual Shorty Awards in 2014, the account won an award in the "#Fakeaccount" category.

Last Week Tonight with John Oliver 
In 2014, Gondelman was hired by Last Week Tonight with John Oliver as the web producer for the show's first season, and became a staff writer for the second season. In 2016, he won a Primetime Emmy Award for Outstanding Writing for a Variety Series for his work on the show. He and the writing team of Last Week Tonight won this same award in 2017, as well as a Writers Guild of America Award in 2017.

Desus & Mero
In 2019, Gondelman left Last Week Tonight to become a senior staff writer and producer on Desus & Mero after the series moved to Showtime.

Wait Wait ... Don't Tell Me!
Since 2019, Gondelman has been a regular panelist on the NPR show Wait Wait... Don't Tell Me!. In March of 2023, Gondelman was the guest host filling if for Peter Sagal while Sagal was on paternity leave.

Personal life
Gondelman is married to Maris Kreizman, the creator of the blog, and book, Slaughterhouse 90210. They live in Brooklyn with Bizzy, a senior pug.

Awards 
 2014: Shorty Awards, #Fakeaccount category
 2014: Peabody Award for Last Week Tonight with John Oliver
 2015: Emmy Awards, Outstanding Writing for a Variety Series for Last Week Tonight with John Oliver (nominee)
 2016: Emmy Awards, Outstanding Writing for a Variety Series for Last Week Tonight with John Oliver
 2017: Writers Guild of America Award, Comedy/Variety Series for Last Week Tonight with John Oliver
 2017: Emmy Awards, Outstanding Writing for a Variety Series for Last Week Tonight with John Oliver
 2019: Emmy Awards, Outstanding Writing for a Variety Series for Last Week Tonight with John Oliver

Discography
 2011: Everything's The Best!
 2016: Physical Whisper
 2019: Dancing on a Weeknight 
 2022: People Pleaser

Filmography 
 2011: Quiet Desperation (TV series) – Actor (3 episodes)
 2011: Viral Video (short) – as Agent
 2013: Splashie (TV series short) – as Criminal
 2014: Billy on the Street with Billy Eichner (TV series) – Creative consultant (2 episodes)
 2014: Ramsey Has a Time Machine (TV series) – as Jackson Pollock in "Art"
 2015–present: Last Week Tonight with John Oliver (TV Series) – Producer (11 episodes), Writer (14 episodes)
 2016: Night Train with Wyatt Cenac (TV series) – Actor in "Links & Logs"
 2016: The Comedy Show Show (TV series) – Actor in "RISK! With Kevin Allison"
 2016: @Midnight (TV series) – as himself
 2017: Wiki What (Facebook show) - Host
2020: The George Lucas Talk Show - as himself. Episode: "Revenge of the Sick: After Show"

Works and publications 
 
 
 

Selected articles
 
 
 
 
 
 
 
 
 
 
 
 
 
 
 
 
Wiki What?

References

External links
 
 
 

1985 births
21st-century American male actors
21st-century American writers
American comedy writers
American Internet celebrities
American magazine writers
American stand-up comedians
Brandeis University alumni
Comedians from Massachusetts
Comedians from New York City
Jewish American male comedians
Jewish American male actors
Jewish American writers
Living people
Male actors from Massachusetts
Male actors from New York City
People from Stoneham, Massachusetts
Writers from Massachusetts
Writers from New York City
Emmy Award winners
21st-century American comedians